Carmel School is a CBSE school at Pandeshwar in Mangalore city of Karnataka state in India. It was established as an English Medium school in 1951. In 2014, it was affiliated to CBSE. Co-curricular activities such as Karate, Music classes, Dance classes and Zumba classes are offered to the students by this school.

The school Motto 
The school motto is quoted as follows

"1. Wheel of progress
Symbolizing onward march

2. Bird's upward flight
Symbol of pursuit of excellence, perseverance and purity

3. Mountain of Carmel
Symbol of contemplation

4. Cross surmounting the mountain
Symbol of triumph of suffering prayer

5. Lamp of Light
Prayer and dedication"

Education Labs 
The school contains the following labs
 Bio-Tech Lab
 Physics Lab
 Chemistry Lab
 Biology Lab
 Computer Science Lab
 Home Science Lab

References 

High schools and secondary schools in Karnataka
Christian schools in Karnataka
Schools in Mangalore
Schools in Dakshina Kannada district
Catholic secondary schools in India
Educational institutions established in 1951
1951 establishments in Mysore State